Edward James Caskin (December 30, 1851 – October 9, 1924), born in Danvers, Massachusetts, was a baseball shortstop for the Troy Trojans (1879–1881), New York Gothams/Giants (1883–1884 and 1886) and St. Louis Maroons (1885).

In 7 seasons he played in 482 games and had 1,871 at bats, 229 runs, 427 hits, 50 doubles, 10 triples, 2 home runs, 163 RBI, 82 walks, .228 batting average, .261 on-base percentage, .269 slugging percentage and 503 total bases.

Caskin died in his hometown of Danvers at the age of 72.

Sources

1851 births
1924 deaths
19th-century baseball players
Major League Baseball shortstops
Troy Trojans players
New York Gothams players
St. Louis Maroons players
New York Giants (NL) players
Rochester (minor league baseball) players
Newburyport Clamdiggers players
Lynn (minor league baseball) players
Rochester Maroons players
Salem Fairies players
Baseball players from Massachusetts
People from Danvers, Massachusetts
Sportspeople from Essex County, Massachusetts